XHBAK-FM is a radio station in Bachajón, Chilón, Chiapas. It broadcasts on 98.7 FM and is known as Radio Ach' Lequilc'op, broadcasting programs principally in Tzeltal to serve the local Mayan indigenous community.

History
The station launched on March 21, 2015, after receiving its permit in September 2014. It was originally held by a civil association, Comunicación Educativa y Cultural Bats'il K'op, A.C. In February 2017, in order to transition the station to a social indigenous concession, the station was transferred to direct control by the indigenous community.

References

Radio stations in Chiapas
Community radio stations in Mexico
Indigenous radio stations in Mexico
Radio stations established in 2015